The Broadmoor Manitou and Pikes Peak Cog Railway (also known as the Pikes Peak Cog Railway) is a cog railway that climbs one of the most iconic mountains in the United States, Pikes Peak in Colorado. The base station is in Manitou Springs, near Colorado Springs.

Construction on the line was started in 1889 and the first train reached the summit on June 30, 1891. Cog railways are common in Switzerland and found in other parts of the world (totaling about 50 lines), but this is one of only three such lines remaining in the United States, the others being the older Mount Washington Cog Railway in New Hampshire, and the short Quincy and Torch Lake Cog Railway.

Originally powered by steam locomotives, the line later switched over to diesel-powered locomotives and self-propelled railcars. The railway was closed between October 29, 2017 and May 20, 2021, for a complete refurbishment that saw the replacement of the track infrastructure, the rebuild of older railcars and the purchase of three new trainsets.

History
The idea for the railroad came in 1888, after a trip to the summit by inventor Zalmon G. Simmons, who had founded previously the Simmons Bedding Company. Simmons had designed a wooden telegraph insulator while on the board of directors of Western Union, and was surveying Englemann Canyon for telegraph lines to the top of Pikes Peak. It was a miserable two-day trip on a mule and after his return, Simmons was convinced that there needed to be a more "civilized" mode of travel to the summit of Pikes Peak and decided to fund the construction of a railway.

The average grade of the line would be 12% but would top out at 25%. Normal trains can not retain traction on the rails at grades steeper than 10%, so the railway would need to use a cog and rack system to help pull trains up the mountain and control the speed of the descent.

Construction was started in 1889, being built by Italian laborers using only pickaxes and assisted by donkeys. The line was built as a standard-gauge railway with an Abt rack system and wooden ties. Limited service was started in 1890 on the first segment of the line from Manitou Springs to the Halfway House Hotel. On June 30, 1891, the first train reached the summit.

Three steam locomotives were built for the line by the Baldwin Locomotive Works that each featured boilers offset by 16 degrees to keep them level on the steeply inclined grades. While most locomotives pull rail cars, these steam engines would push the line's wooden passenger cars up the mountain, decreasing the chance of a runaway car. 

A fourth steam locomotive was added to the fleet in 1892 (which was built as a Vauclain compound), which proved to be more efficient and cut the cost of operating on a steep incline. The locomotive was so successful that the original locomotives were rebuilt as Vauclain compounds in 1893. Over time, the Vauclain compound technology made the locomotives notoriously difficult to maintain. An additional locomotive was added to the fleet in 1901 and again in 1906. All six steam locomotives were rebuilt in 1912 to similar specifications and would burn slightly under 1 ton of coal per trip.

Just before the start of the Great Depression, Spencer Penrose purchased a stake in the line. Penrose was the owner of The Broadmoor, a well-known hotel in Colorado Springs.

Under the control of Penrose, there was an effort to find more economical ways to operate the line. To that end, gasoline-powered railcar #7 was constructed in 1938. The railcar was intended to be a cheaper alternative to operating steam locomotives during quieter times of the year. The railcar was a huge success, and led the railroad to purchase five 'streamlined' diesel locomotives from General Electric, which were equipped with matching passenger cars, acquired from 1939 onward. 

The diesel locomotives slowly supplanted the steam locomotives, though some steam operations persisted until the 1960s as backup power and to operate the snow-clearing train (where their greater weight meant they were less likely to derail).

The railroad started switching over to a fleet of self-propelled railcars in 1964, purchasing two units (#14 and #15) from Swiss Locomotive and Machine Works (SLM), which would be similar to equipment used on many Swiss cog railways. The air-cooled, 8-cylinder diesel engines in the first units proved to be less than satisfactory on the railroad above the tree line and were replaced by water-cooled engines. The railcars proved to be a good addition to the fleet and the railroad purchased two more railcars (#16 and #17) in 1968.

As tourism increased in the 1970s the railway needed more capacity. In 1976, the railway took delivery from SLM of two larger railcars (#18 and #19). These are identical in cosmetic appearance to cars 14-17, however consist of two articulated cars. Passing sidings were built at Minnehaha and Windy Point, allowing trains to pass at various points on the hill. Trains could previously pass only at Mountain View, permitting only three trains a day up the mountain. Eight trains per day became possible with the new equipment and sidings. Two additional two-car trainsets were added in the 1980s (#24 in 1984 and #25 in 1989).

By the 2000s, the rail infrastructure was starting to show its age. Railway managers reported that in 2017 the track geometry had become so poor that the cog wheels were wearing out twice as quickly as they did in the 1980s. Winter operations were suspended on October 29, 2017, to conduct maintenance on the railway, but crews soon realized more serious repairs were needed and in March 2018 it was announced that the railway would close indefinitely. 

The Anschutz Corporation, which owned the railway, estimated a full refurbishment of the line would cost $100 million. The company negotiated a deal with the city of Manitou Springs that would provide $36 million in tax breaks for the railroad over a 50-year period if the company completed the upgrades. The agreement was signed on November 20, 2018.

The major refurbishment project would involve the near-complete replacement of the track infrastructure, the rebuild of facilities and older railcars and the purchase of three new trainsets.

Starting in March 2019, crews ripped up the old rails, Abt rack system, and wooden ties, some of which had been in place since the line was first built in 1889. Work started at the depot in Manitou Springs and reached the summit in September. In May 2020, crews began working down from the top, laying down metal ties, new rails custom ordered from Poland and a new Strub rack system which featured more robust teeth. Crews also replaced the old manual track switches with radio-controlled versions that would enable faster operations at the passing sidings.

While the track work was underway, crews at the railroad shops in Manitou Springs began to rebuild the four two-car SLM railcars (Nos. 18, 19, 24 and 25). Each railcar was converted to the new Strub system, received a new transmission with a retarder for dynamic breaking and was repowered with new diesel engines.

The railroad also placed an order for three trainsets (Nos. 27, 28 and 29) from Stadler Rail of Switzerland. Each trainset would consist of a diesel-electric locomotive, two coaches and a control car, and marked a return to locomotive-hauled trains. Additionally, a snowblower (No. 30) was ordered from Stadler's partner, Zaugg AG Eggiwill of Switzerland. The snowblower has a diesel engine to turn its blades, but it is not self-propelled, but instead acts as a control car and pushed by one of the Stadler locomotives. In February 2021, the new equipment was shipped from Switzerland to the United States, arriving in Manitou Springs the next month.

Meanwhile, the city of Colorado Springs (which operates the Pikes Peak Highway) built a new visitor center at the summit, while the railroad built a new platform. Down in Manitou Springs, the depot received a second boarding track and platform.

The line reopened on May 20, 2021.

Manitou Incline

More commonly called simply the Manitou Incline, the Mount Manitou Scenic Incline Railway was actually a funicular up the side of a peak called Rocky Mountain located adjacent to Mount Manitou. It was operated by the Manitou and Pike's Peak Railway until its closure following a rockslide in 1990. This line's lower terminus was adjacent to the Cog Railway base station in Manitou Springs.

The Manitou Incline was initially built in 1907 for use in the construction of city water lines and a hydroelectric plant.  When the construction was finished, the Manitou and Pike's Peak Railway took over the cable car as a tourist operation.

From 1990 forward, the defunct Incline had been controversial because, although legally off-limits to the public, its roadbed was heavily used for recreation and exercise by people ignoring the trespassing signs. It became legal to use the Incline on February 1, 2013.  Colorado Springs Parks and Recreation manages the Incline trail through an intergovernmental agreement.

Roster

See also 

Green Mountain Cog Railway
List of Colorado historic railroads
List of heritage railroads in the United States
List of rack railways
Mount Washington Cog Railway
Quincy and Torch Lake Cog Railway

References

External links 

Heritage railroads in Colorado
Mountain railways
Manitou Springs, Colorado
Pikes Peak
Tourist attractions in El Paso County, Colorado
Rack railways in the United States
Transportation in El Paso County, Colorado